Mădălin Popa (born 18 July 1983) is a Romanian professional footballer who plays as a midfielder for Speranța Răucești, in the Liga IV. In his career Popa also played for CSM Roman and Ceahlăul Piatra Neamț.

References

External links
 

1983 births
Living people
People from Roman, Romania
Romanian footballers
Association football midfielders
Liga I players
Liga II players
CSM Ceahlăul Piatra Neamț players